Lambertus "Bep" van Klaveren (26 September 1907 – 12 February 1992) was a Dutch boxer, who won the gold medal in the featherweight division at the 1928 Summer Olympics in Amsterdam. Van Klaveren remains the only Dutch boxer to have won an Olympic gold medal. His younger brother Piet competed as a boxer at the 1952 Summer Olympics.

Biography
Born in Rotterdam as Lambertus Steenhorst, he adopted the name of his stepfather Pieter van Klaveren when he was eight. After primary school, he worked as a butcher's assistant and fought in his spare time. He seriously took up boxing aged 16, and around that time changed to a vegetarian diet believing it fits better for a boxer. In 1926 he won the national flyweight title and in 1927–29 the featherweight title. After his Olympic success in 1928, he received a hero’s welcome in his hometown Rotterdam and was presented to the Dutch Queen and her prince consort.

In 1929 van Klaveren began a long career of professional boxer, which ended in 1956. In 1931 he became European champion in the lightweight division and in 1938 he won the same title in the middleweight division. During his professional tenure, van Klaveren fought on four continents and won fights against Ceferino Garcia and Kid Azteca. He also faced Hall of Famers Young Corbett III and Billy Petrolle.

In 1935 van Klaveren married Margarite Olivera, daughter of a banker. He lost much money through her excessive lifestyle and through his boxing manager. Van Klaveren was sentenced for one year for assaulting Olivera. He was released on bail after three months and fled to Rotterdam, leaving behind all his possessions.

During World War II van Klaveren served overseas with the Dutch army. He then moved to Australia with his second wife, an Australian nurse, and worked there as a sports teacher, dock worker, bouncer, and boxing instructor. He then returned to Rotterdam and retired in 1948, but returned to the ring in 1954 and won 11 out of 12 bouts. He retired for good in 1956 after an unsuccessful attempt to win the European welterweight title. The same year he married for the third time, and for several years ran a cigar shop with his wife, though with little success. He continued to train through all his life and did not smoke or drink alcohol. He died in 1992 in his native Rotterdam, aged 84. The same year a memorial statue of van Klaveren was installed in Rotterdam. The annual Bep van Klaveren boxing memorial was launched in 1993, and became the largest boxing competition in the Netherlands.

Gallery

Professional boxing record

References

1907 births
1992 deaths
Dutch male boxers
Olympic boxers of the Netherlands
Boxers at the 1928 Summer Olympics
Olympic gold medalists for the Netherlands
Boxers from Rotterdam
Olympic medalists in boxing
Featherweight boxers
Medalists at the 1928 Summer Olympics